Răducan is a Romanian surname.

People with this surname include:
 Johnny Răducanu, né Răducan Crețu (1931 in Brăila, Muntenia – 2011), a Romanian jazz pianist of Romani descent
 Necula Răducan(u) (born 1946 in Vlădeni, Ialomița, Muntenia)
 Marcel Răducan (born 1967 in Grinăuţi-Moldova, Moldova), a Moldovan politician
 Narcis Claudiu Răducan (born 1974 in Focşani, Vrancea, Moldavia), a Romanian football player
 Andreea Mădălina Răducan (born 1983 in Bârlad, Moldavia), a Romanian female gymnast

See also 
 Răducanu (surname)
 Radu (given name)
 Radu (surname)
 Rădulescu (surname)
 Rădeni (disambiguation)
 Rădești (disambiguation)
 Răduțești (disambiguation)
 Rădulești (disambiguation)

Romanian-language surnames